Shiho Fujita (born May 11, 1985), known by her stage name Sifow (stylized as sifow), is a Japanese pop singer, model and businesswoman. She signed to the Avex Trax music label in 2006, but in 2008 she announced her retirement from the music industry. She has since focused on business and health advocacy, and established Office G-Revo Corporation in 2010.

Discography

Studio albums

Mini albums

Singles 

  = singles released before Sifow's debut under Avex Trax

References

External links 
Sifow's official blog (2005–2008) 
Sifow's official blog (2000–present) 
JaME artist page

Sifow
Living people
1985 births
Musicians from Chiba Prefecture
Japanese women pop singers
21st-century Japanese singers
21st-century Japanese women singers